The 1869 Birthday Honours were appointments by Queen Victoria to various orders and honours to reward and highlight good works by citizens of the British Empire. The appointments were made to celebrate the official birthday of the Queen, and were published in The London Gazette on 2 June 4 June and 1 July 1869.

The recipients of honours are displayed here as they were styled before their new honour, and arranged by honour, with classes (Knight, Knight Grand Cross, etc.) and then divisions (Military, Civil, etc.) as appropriate.

United Kingdom and British Empire

The Most Illustrious Order of Saint Patrick

Knight of the Most Illustrious Order of Saint Patrick (KP)
Granville, Earl of Carysfort
Archibald, Earl of Gosford

The Most Honourable Order of the Bath

Knight Grand Cross of the Order of the Bath (GCB)

Military Division
Royal Navy
Admiral Sir Henry Prescott 
Vice-Admiral Sir Augustus Leopold Kuper 

Army
General George Charles, Earl of Lucan 
General Sir Richard James Dacres 
Lieutenant-General the Honourable Sir James Yorke Scarlett  
Lieutenant-General Sir George Buller

Knight Commander of the Order of the Bath (KCB)

Military Division
Royal Navy
Vice-Admiral William Ramsay 
Vice-Admiral the Right Honourable Lord Clarence Edward Paget 
Vice Admiral Henry Kellett 
Rear Admiral Hastings Reginald Yelverton 
Rear-Admiral Bartholomew James Sulivan 

Army
Lieutenant-General George Frederick, Viscount Templetown 
Lieutenant-General Edward Huthwaite 
Major-General Frederick Horn 
Major-General Arthur Augustus Thurlow Cunynghame 
Major-General Lord George Augustus Frederick Paget 
Major-General Arthur Johnstone Lawrence 
Major-General Horatio Shirley 
Major-General William Jones 
Major-General John St George 
Major-General Edward Charles Warde 
Major-General James Brind 
Major-General the Right Honourable Percy Egerton Herbert 
Major-General John Lintorn Arabin Simmons 
Major-General Archibald Little  
Colonel Alfred Thomas Wilde  Madras Army
Thomas Galbraith Logan  Director-General of the Medical Department of the Army

Companion of the Order of the Bath (CB)

Military Division
Royal Navy
Rear-Admiral Sir John Charles Dalrymple-Hay 
Rear-Admiral Charles Farrel Hillyar
Staff-Captain William Trickett Wheeler
Captain Edward Augustus Inglefield
Captain Edward Tatham
Captain George Granville Randolph
Captain Charles Joseph Frederick Ewart
Captain Robert Hall
Captain Octavius Cumberland 
Captain George William Preedy  (Civil)
Captain George Le Geyt Bowyear 
Captain John Corbett
Captain David Craigie
Captain John Edmund Commerell   (Civil)
Captain William Everard Alphonso Gordon

Army
General Henry Ivatt Delacombe, Royal Marine Light Infantry
General John Tatton Brown, Royal Marine Light Infantry
Lieutenant-General Alexander Anderson, Royal Marine Light Infantry
Major-General George Colt Langley, Royal Marine Light Infantry
Colonel Charles Cameron Shute, 4th Dragoon Guards
Colonel Thomas Hook Pearson
Colonel Lawrence Fyler, 12th Lancers
Colonel Robert William Disney Leith
Colonel Henry James Stannus, 20th Hussars
Colonel Henry Forster, Royal Artillery
Colonel Henry Garner Rainey
Colonel Joseph Edwin Thackwell
Colonel Lawrence Shadwell
Colonel George Frederick Stevenson Call, 18th Regiment
Colonel Henry Poole Hepburn, Scots Fusilier Guards
Colonel John Christopher Guise  
Colonel John Hynde King, Grenadier Guards
Colonel Horace William Montagu, Royal Engineers
Colonel the Honourable Henry Hugh Clifford 
Colonel William Templer Hughes, Bengal Army
Colonel Doveton Hodson, Madras Army
Colonel Henry Hope Crealock
Colonel Joseph Lyon Barrow, Royal Artillery
Colonel Charles Cureton, Bengal Army
Colonel the Honourable Percy Robert Basil Feilding, Coldstream Guards
Colonel the Honourable David McDowall Fraser, Royal Artillery
Colonel John Patrick Redmond, 61st Regiment
Colonel William Hardy, Depot Battalion
Colonel Pearson Scott Thompson, 14th Hussars
Colonel Charles Loudon Barnard, Royal Marine Artillery
Colonel Henry Peel Yates, Royal Artillery
Colonel John Edward Michell, Royal Artillery
Colonel Charles Hodgkinson Smith, Royal Artillery
Colonel Nathaniel Octavius Simpson Turner, Royal Artillery
Colonel Thomas Raikes, 102nd Regiment
Colonel Charles William Adair, Royal Marine Light Infantry
Colonel Richard Bulkeley Prettejohn, 18th Hussars
Colonel Alfred William Lucas, Bombay Army
Colonel Henry William Holland, Bombay Army
Colonel Henry Andrew Sarel, 17th Lancers
Lieutenant-Colonel James Farrell Pennycuick, Royal Artillery
Lieutenant-Colonel Frederick Robert Mein, 94th Regiment
Lieutenant-Colonel Robert William Harley, 3rd West India Regiment
Lieutenant-Colonel Charles Brisbane Ewart, Royal Engineers
Lieutenant-Colonel Thomas James, Bengal Army
Lieutenant-Colonel Alexander Mackenzie, 78th Regiment
Major Trevenen James Holland, Bombay Army
Inspector-General of Hospitals and Fleets George Burn 
Inspector-General of Hospitals George Stewart Beatson 
Deputy Inspector-General of Hospitals Hampden Hugh Massy 
Staff Surgeon-Major George Saunders

Civil Division
Lieutenant-Colonel Andrew Clarke, Royal Engineers, Director of Engineering and Architectural Works under the Board of Admiralty
John Grant Stewart  Inspector-General of Hospitals and Fleets
Thomas Baker, late Chief Inspector of Machinery, Royal Navy
The Reverend Robert Mills Inskip, Chief Naval Instructor of Her Majesty's Training Ship Britannia for Naval Cadets
Andrew Murray, Surveyor of Factories and Consulting Engineer, Royal Navy
James Scott Robertson, Purveyor-in-Chief to the Army
Henry Tatum, Principal Superintendent of Stores
Penrose Goodchild Julyan, Assistant Commissary-General

The Most Exalted Order of the Star of India

Knight Grand Commander (GCSI)
The Rana of Dholepore

Knight Commander (KCSI)
His Highness the Rajah of Cochin
Lieutenant-General John Campbell  Madras Army
Major-General George Le Grand Jacob  late Bombay Army

Companion (CSI)
Major-General Henry Renny, formerly in command of Her Majesty's 81st Regiment in the Punjab
Syud Ahmed Khan, late Principal Sudder Ameen, Allyghur, Bengal
Henry Charles Hamilton, Bengal Civil Service (Retired), late Chief Civil Officer and Government Agent at Ghazeepore during the Mutinies 1857-1858
Cowasjee Jehanghier, of Bombay 
Richard Pryce Harrison, Bengal Civil Service (Retired), late Controller-General of Accounts, Bengal
Colonel George Samuel Montgomery, Bombay Army, Brigadier-General, Commanding the Forces at Neemuch, sometime in command of Police in Upper Scinde
Major Henry Court, Bengal Civil Service, Commissioner at Allahabad
Colonel John Blick Spurgin, 102nd Regiment Madras Fusiliers
Colonel Edward Arthur Henry Webb, Madras Staff Corps
Colonel William George Woods, Madras Staff Corps, late Adjutant-General of the Madras Army
William James Money, Bengal Civil Service
George Nelson Barlow, Bengal Civil Service, Magistrate and Collector of Pooree, in Orissa, during the famine of 1866
John William Shaw Wyllie, Bombay Civil Service (Retired), late Under-Secretary to the Government of India, Foreign Department
Lieutenant-Colonel George Hutchinson, Bengal Staff Corps, Inspector-General of the Punjab Police
Captain Edward Thompson, Bengal Staff Corps, Deputy Commissioner in Oude 
Major William Dickinson, Bombay Staff Corps, Second in command of the 3rd Regiment Scinde Horse, sometime Acting Political Agent in Baloochistan
John F. Arthur  late Surgeon-Major, Madras Medical Department
Captain Meadows Taylor, late Deputy-Commissioner Hyderabad assigned Districts
Richard Vicars Boyle
Meer Akbar Ali, of Hyderabad, in the Deccan, late of the Intelligence Department, Abyssinian Field Force

The Most Distinguished Order of Saint Michael and Saint George

Knight Grand Cross of the Order of St Michael and St George (GCMG)
The Right Honourable Earl of Derby  sometime one of Her Majesty's Principal Secretaries of State having the Department of War and Colonies
The Right Honourable Earl Grey  sometime one of Her Majesty's Principal Secretaries of State having the Department of War and Colonies
The Right Honourable Earl Russell  sometime one of Her Majesty's Principal Secretaries of State having the Department of War and Colonies

Colonial Office
The Right Honourable Viscount Monck, late Governor-General of the Dominion of Canada, and Captain-General and Governor-in-Chief of the Island of Prince Edward

Knight Commander of the Order of St Michael and St George (KCMG)
Paul Edmund de Strzelecki 
The Right Honourable Baron Lyttelton, sometime Under Secretary of State for War and Colonies
The Right Honourable Frederick Peel, sometime Under Secretary of State for War and Colonies
The Right Honourable Charles Bowyer-Adderley, late Under Secretary of State for the Colonies
Sir Frederic Rogers  Under Secretary of State for the Colonies
Sir Hercules George Robert Robinson  Governor and Commander-in-Chief of the Island of Ceylon
Alexander Tilloch Galt, late Minister for Finance in the Dominion of Canada
Henry Taylor, of the Colonial Department
Thomas Frederick Elliot, late Assistant Under Secretary of State for the Colonies

Colonial Office
Francis Hincks  late Governor and Commander-in-Chief of the Colony of British Guiana
James Walker  Governor and Commander-in-Chief of the Bahama Islands
Major-General Charles Hastings Doyle, Lieutenant-Governor of the Province of Nova Scotia, in the Dominion of Canada

Companion of the Order of St Michael and St George (CMG)
George Macleay, of New South Wales

Colonial Office
Charles Cowper, late Chief Minister of the Government of New South Wales
William Charles Gibson, late Colonial Secretary of the Island of Ceylon
Felix Bedingfeld, late Colonial Secretary for the Island of Mauritius
John Bayley Darvall, late Attorney-General of the Colony of New South Wales
John Sealey, Attorney-General of the Island of Barbados
John Lucie-Smith, Attorney-General of the Colony of British Guiana
Thomas Skinner, late Civil Engineer and Commissioner of Roads for the Island of Ceylon
Theophilus Shepstone, Secretary for Native Affairs in the Colony of Natal
Ferdinand Mueller MD, Government Botanist for the Colony of Victoria

References

Birthday Honours
1869 awards
1868 in Australia
1869 in India
1869 in the United Kingdom